The Seventh Avenue West Incline ran in Duluth, Minnesota, from 1891 until 1939, when the tracks were sold for scrap for the war effort.

Statistics

Length:   
Elevation:   
Time:   15 minutes (bottom to top)
Fare:   $0.15($ in  dollars)

See also
Duluth Belt Line Railway
List of funicular railways

References

Transportation in Duluth, Minnesota
Defunct funicular railways in the United States
Defunct Minnesota railroads
1891 establishments in Minnesota
1939 disestablishments in Minnesota